Prosek is a Prague Metro station of Line C, located in Prosek, Prague 9. The station was opened on 8 May 2008 as part of the Line C extension from Ládví to Letňany.

References

External links 

 Gallery and information 

Prague Metro stations
Railway stations opened in 2008
2008 establishments in the Czech Republic
Railway stations in the Czech Republic opened in the 21st century